Preserver can refer to:

 Life preserver, a personal flotation device or lifebuoy
 Life preserver, a type of club (weapon) 
 , a Canadian navy ship
 , Protecteur-class supply ship
 , leadship of the Fairmile-support depot ships
 , a U.S. navy ship
 Preserver (Elfquest), a race in the fantasy comic Elfquest
 Preservers (Star Trek), a Star Trek species
 Preserver (Star Trek), a novel by William Shatner